Vasundharā or Dharaṇī is a chthonic goddess from Buddhist mythology of Theravada in Southeast Asia. Similar earth deities include Pṛthivī, Kṣiti, and Dharaṇī,  Vasudhara bodhisattva  in Vajrayana and Bhoomi devi and Prithvi in hinduism.

Etymology
She is known by various names throughout Southeast Asia. 
In Khmer, she is known by her title Neang Konghing (lit. "lady princess"), or as Preah Thoroni or Preah Mae Thoroni ("Mother Earth Goddess"). In Burmese, she is known as Wathondare (ဝသုန္ဓရေ) or Wathondara (ဝသုန္ဓရာ) (from ) and variously transliterated as Wathundari, Wathundaye, Vasundari, etc. In Thai and other Tai languages, she is known as Thorani (from ) in various appellations, including Nang Thorani, Mae Thorani, and Phra Mae Thorani.

Iconography and symbology
 
Images of Phra Mae Thorani are common in shrines and Buddhist temples of Burma, Cambodia, Thailand and Laos. According to Buddhist myths, Phra Mae Thorani is personified as a young woman wringing the cool waters of detachment out of her hair to drown Mara, the demon sent to tempt Gautama Buddha as he meditated under the Bodhi Tree.

In temple murals, Phra Mae Thorani is often depicted with the Buddha in the mudra known as calling the earth to witness. The waters flowing forth from her long hair wash away the armies of Mara and symbolize the water of the bodhisattva's perfection of generosity (dāna paramī).

Calling the earth to witness

In the iconography of Gautama Buddha in Laos and Thailand, "touching the earth" mudra (Maravijaya Attitude) refers to the Buddha's pointing towards the earth to summon the Earth Goddess to come to his assistance in obtaining enlightenment by witnessing to his past good deeds.

Buddhist water libation 

In Buddhism in Burma, the water ceremony (yay zet cha), which involves the ceremonial pouring of water from a glass into a vase, drop by drop, concludes most Buddhist ceremonies including donation celebrations and feasts. This ceremonial libation is done to share the accrued merit with all other living beings in all 31 planes of existence. While the water is poured, a confession of faith, called the hsu taung imaya dhammanu, is recited and led by the monks. Then, the merit is distributed by the donors, called ahmya wei, by saying Ahmya ahmya ahmya yu daw mu gya ba gon law three times, with the audience responding thadu, Pali for "well done." The earth goddess, known in Burmese as Wathondara or Wathondare, is invoked to witness these meritorious deeds. Afterward, the libated water is poured on soil outside, to return the water to the goddess.

Modern use as a symbol
Phra Mae Thorani is featured in the logo of:
The Metropolitan Waterworks Authority and Provincial Waterworks Authority of Thailand.
The Democrat Party (Thailand) to emphasise the importance of earth and water for Thailand, together with the Pali proverb sachamwe amatta wacha "truth is indeed the undying word," to symbolise the values of the Party.

Gallery

See also
Mother goddess
Prithvi
Vasudhara
Phosop
Bhūmi

Notes

References

Bibliography

External links

Mae Phra Thorani Monument
 Maï Thorani, Déesse de la Terre

Female buddhas and supernatural beings
Earth goddesses
Thai goddesses
Southeast Asian culture
Burmese folklore
Cambodian folklore
Laotian folklore
Thai folklore